The General Staff of the Armed Forces of the Russian Federation is the military staff of the Russian Armed Forces. It is the central organ of the military command of the Armed Forces Administration and oversees operational command of the armed forces under the Russian Ministry of Defence.

As of 2012, the Chief of the General Staff is Army General Valery Gerasimov and since 2014, the First Deputy Chief of the General Staff is Colonel General Nikolay Bogdanovsky. 

The General Staff Building is located in Moscow on Znamenka Street in the Arbat District. Together with the Main Building of the Ministry of Defense and several Staff directorate office buildings nearby, it forms the so-called "Arbat military district" as it is often referred to among the military personnel to outline the highest supreme command of the Russian Armed Forces.

History

In the Soviet Armed Forces, the  acted as the main commanding and supervising body of the military. A Red Army Staff first formed in 1921 but, historian John Erickson says, until 1924 developed into an unwieldy grouping dealing with combat training, routine Red Army affairs, and defence policy, all without real definition. Erickson dates the development of the Staff as the Soviet "military brain" from Mikhail Frunze's appointment to the post of Chief of Staff by Order No.78 of 1 April 1924. 'From this date.. the history of the Soviet General Staff – as it was to become – begins'.

On 22 September 1935, the authorities renamed the RKKA Staff as the General Staff, which essentially reincarnated the General Staff of the Russian Empire. Many of the former RKKA Staff officers had served as General Staff officers in the Russian Empire and became General Staff officers in the USSR. General Staff officers typically had extensive combat experience and solid academic training.

William Odom wrote:

During the Cold War, the Soviet General Staff maintained Soviet plans for the invasion of Western Europe, whose massive scale was made known secretly to the West by spies such as Ryszard Kukliński and later published by German researchers working with the National People's Army files, and the Parallel History Project and the associated Polish exercise documents, Seven Days to the River Rhine (1979).

Since the dissolution of the Soviet Union and especially since 2004 the General Staff and the Russian Ministry of Defence have attempted to divide direction of the armed forces between them, often in intense bouts of bureaucratic disagreement. It has been reported that the General Staff's main role now is that of the Russian Ministry of Defence's department of strategic planning, and the Minister of Defence himself is now gaining executive authority over the troops. This is, however, contradicted by some Russian commentators and defence analysts.

Defence Minister Anatoliy Serdyukov who initiated the 2008 military reform, in order for separation of operational and administrative functions, the Ministry of Defense formed two functional lines of responsibility: the first was planning the use and construction of the Armed Forces, the second was planning the comprehensive support of troops (forces). The transition to a three-tier principle of responsibility was conducted: the main commands of the branches and formations were responsible for combat training, and the General Staff, joint strategic commands and formations were responsible for operational training. As a result of the transformations carried out, the General Staff was freed from duplicate functions and became a full-fledged strategic planning body that organizes and exercises control of the Armed Forces in fulfilling the assigned tasks.

The General Staff's history dates back to its creation as early as 25 January 1763 during the Russian Empire. The Day of the General Staff of the Armed Forces of the Russian Federation is celebrated annually on 25 January even though the current General Staff of Russia was established at a different date.

General Staff organization
As of September 2015:

 Main Directorate of Communications
 Main Operational Directorate
 Main Intelligence Directorate (GRU)
 Main Organizational Mobilization Directorate
 Directorate of  the Chief of Radioelectronic Combat Troops
 Military Topographical Directorate
 Main Command – Ground Forces
 Main Command – Navy
 Main Command – Air Forces
 Aerospace Defense Command – Space Forces and 
 Strategic Rocket Forces Command
 Airborne Forces Command
 Special Operations Forces Command; (2012 – present)
 National Defense Management Center
 Operational Training Directorate
 8th Directorate
 Troop service and safety of military service Directorate
 Directorate of the Chief of the Construction and Development of Unmanned Aerial Vehicle systems
 Directorate of the Chief of the Radiation, Chemical, and Biological Defense Troops
 Directorate of the Chief of Engineering Troops
 Main Directorate for Deep Sea Research
 Central Command Post
 Hydrometeorological Service

References

Further reading
 Захаров М.В. Генеральный штаб в предвоенные годы. — М.: Воениздат, 1989
 Zakharov, M.V. General Staff in the Pre-war Uears, Moscow, Voenizdat., 1989 (chapter 6)

External links
 Dr S. J. Main, The "Brain" of the Russian Army: The Centre for Military-Strategic Research, General Staff, 1985–2000, Conflict Studies Research Centre, UK MOD

Military of Russia
Military of the Soviet Union
Staff (military)